The 2012 ATP China Challenger International was a professional tennis tournament played on hard courts. It was the second edition of the tournament which was part of the 2012 ATP Challenger Tour. It took place in Wuhan, China between 23 and 29 July 2012.

Singles main-draw entrants

Seeds

 1 Rankings are as of July 16, 2012.

Other entrants
The following players received wildcards into the singles main draw:
  Ma Ya-Nan
  Ning Yuqing
  Ouyang Bowen
  Wang Chuhan

The following players received entry from the qualifying draw:
  Matthew Barton
  Adam Feeney
  Nikolaus Moser
  Luke Saville

Champions

Singles

 Aljaž Bedene def  Josselin Ouanna, 6–3, 4–6, 6–3

Doubles

 Sanchai Ratiwatana /  Sonchat Ratiwatana def.  Adam Feeney /  Samuel Groth, 6–4, 2–6, [10–8]

ATP China Challenger International
Wuhai Challenger
2012 in Chinese tennis